The 1930–31 SK Rapid Wien season was the 33rd season in club history.

Squad

Squad and statistics

Squad statistics

Fixtures and results

League

Cup

Mitropa Cup

References

1930-31 Rapid Wien Season
Rapid